Mark Edmondson and Kim Warwick were the defending champions, but Warwick did not participate this year.  Edmondson partnered Tomáš Šmíd, losing in the semifinals.

Sergio Casal and Emilio Sánchez won the title, defeating Broderick Dyke and Wally Masur 6–3, 4–6, 6–4 in the final.

Seeds

  Heinz Günthardt /  Balázs Taróczy (first round)
  Mark Edmondson /  Tomáš Šmíd (semifinals)
  Shlomo Glickstein /  Hans Simonsson (first round)
  Sergio Casal /  Emilio Sánchez (champions)

Draw

Draw

External links
 Draw

1986 BMW Open